Weston is an unincorporated community in Webster County, Georgia, United States, located twenty-three miles southwest of Americus. The population was 75 at the 2000 census. In 2009, the former town was disincorporated and consolidated with the Unified Government of Webster County.

History
Some say the town's name honors Joseph L. Weston, an early town elder, while others believe the town site's location in the western portion of the county caused its name to be selected.

The Georgia General Assembly incorporated Weston as a town in 1911. The town's municipal charter was dissolved in 2009.

Geography

The community is located in west central Georgia along Georgia State Route 520 (South Georgia Parkway), which leads northwest 9 mi (15 km) to Richland and southeast 18 mi (29 km) to Dawson. The highway meets Georgia State Route 41 in the community. Columbus is 45 mi (72 km) northwest and Albany is 42 mi (68 km) southeast.

Weston is located at  (31.977666, -84.615451).

Demographics

As of the census of 2000, there were 75 people, 29 households, and 20 families residing in the town. The racial makeup of the town was 81.33% White and 18.67% African American.

There were 29 households, out of which 37.9% had children under the age of 18 living with them, 65.5% were married couples living together, 6.9% had a female householder with no husband present, and 27.6% were non-families. 27.6% of all households were made up of individuals, and 17.2% had someone living alone who was 65 years of age or older. The average household size was 2.59 and the average family size was 3.19.

In the town the population was spread out, with 21.3% under the age of 18, 6.7% from 18 to 24, 21.3% from 25 to 44, 30.7% from 45 to 64, and 20.0% who were 65 years of age or older. The median age was 47 years. For every 100 females, there were 102.7 males. For every 100 females age 18 and over, there were 84.4 males.

The median income for a household in the town was $41,000, and the median income for a family was $41,875. Males had a median income of $28,125 versus $18,750 for females. The per capita income for the town was $22,275. There were no families and 3.0% of the population living below the poverty line, including no under eighteens and 66.7% of those over 64.

Education
Webster County School District operates public schools serving the community.

Gallery

References

Unincorporated communities in Webster County, Georgia
Populated places in Webster County, Georgia
Unincorporated communities in Georgia (U.S. state)
2009 disestablishments in Georgia (U.S. state)
Populated places disestablished in 2009
Former municipalities in Georgia (U.S. state)